Joseph Abraham Werrick (October 25, 1861 – May 10, 1943) was a professional baseball third baseman. He played in Major League Baseball for four seasons in the 19th century.

Partway through the season, he moved on to that league's St. Paul Saints. Later that year, the Saints joined the Union Association as a late-season replacement, and Werrick made his major league debut, playing nine games.

After the UA folded, Werrick returned to the minor leagues.

Sources

Major League Baseball third basemen
St. Paul Saints (UA) players
Louisville Colonels players
Winona Clippers players
Nashville Americans players
St. Paul Apostles players
Baltimore Orioles (Atlantic Association) players
Denver Mountaineers players
Butte (minor league baseball) players
Portland Webfeet players
Minneapolis Millers (baseball) players
Portsmouth Browns players
Springfield Ponies players
Mansfield Haymakers players
Dayton Veterans players
Baseball players from Minnesota
1861 births
1943 deaths
19th-century baseball players